Jon Gindick (born September 10, 1948, Hollywood, California, United States) is an American best-selling musical instruction author. His books, CDs, and videos on playing the blues harmonica have sold over 2,000,000 copies. He puts on 'Blues Harmonica Jam Camp,' a traveling seminar for harmonica players of all levels. Gindick is also a blues guitarist and singer.

References

External links
 Official website
 June 2010 Hollywood music in Media nomination

1948 births
Living people
American blues harmonica players
American blues guitarists
American male guitarists
American blues singers
20th-century American guitarists
20th-century American male musicians